"Turn It Up" a single by Johntá Austin. The remix version of the single features Jadakiss and Twista. The single was produced by Jermaine Dupri and No I.D.

It peaked at number 48 on the U.S. Billboard Hot R&B/Hip-Hop Songs chart. The melody was an interpolation of Delaney and Bonnie's "Superstar".

2006 singles
Def Jam Recordings singles
Song recordings produced by Jermaine Dupri
Song recordings produced by No I.D.